Owe is a surname or given name, a spelling variation of Ove. Notable people with the name include:

Given name
Owe Adamson (born 1935), Swedish cyclist and Olympic competitor
Owe Hellberg (born 1953), Swedish politician
Owe Jonsson (1940–1962), Swedish sprinter, ice hockey and bandy player
Owe Lostad (1922–2013), Swedish rower and Olympic competitor
Owe Nordqvist (1927–2015), Swedish cyclist and Olympic competitor
Owe Ohlsson (born 1938), Swedish footballer and manager
Owe Thörnqvist (born 1929), Swedish troubadour, revue artist and songwriter
Owe Wiktorin (born 1940), Swedish general

Surname
Baard Owe (1936–2017), Norwegian-born actor

Swedish masculine given names
Norwegian-language surnames